Gordon James Mackay Nisbet (born 18 September 1951) is an English retired professional footballer who made over 600 league appearances in English football. Nisbet began his career as a goalkeeper but was later converted into a right back.

Club career
Born in Wallsend, Nisbet played youth football for Northumberland Schools. When he left school at the age of eighteen in 1969, he signed for West Bromwich Albion, and also played league football for Hull City, Plymouth Argyle and Exeter City.

International career
Nisbet earned one cap for the England under-23 team in 1972.

Coaching career
Nisbet was caretaker manager of Plymouth Argyle, alongside Alan Gillett, for two games in 1992.

After football
After finishing his professional football career in 1988, Nisbet continued to play non-League football, and later joined the Devon and Cornwall Police.

References

1951 births
Living people
English footballers
England under-23 international footballers
English football managers
West Bromwich Albion F.C. players
Hull City A.F.C. players
Plymouth Argyle F.C. players
Exeter City F.C. players
Sportspeople from Wallsend
Footballers from Tyne and Wear
Association football fullbacks